The School of International Affairs of Pennsylvania State University was officially launched on July 1, 2007, having been approved by Pennsylvania State University's (Penn State) Board of Trustees in January 2007. The school is administratively part of Penn State Law at University Park, PA. It draws extensively upon the intellectual resources of faculty in several academic colleges of the University. The School of International Affairs offers a professional master's degree in international affairs with several speciality concentrations.

Faculty and Administration
The School operates under the guidance of Interim Director Elizabeth Ransom, and a faculty governing council composed of leading faculty from some of Penn State's top graduate departments.

Faculty members include former diplomats, a Navy Vice Admiral, National Security Council staff, a senior official of both the African Union and the United Nations, an economic development agency director, former CIA officials, a State Department Senior Counselor, a U.S. Geological Survey chief scientist, as well as international and arbitration experts and top scholars who contribute to public discourse. Together they represent scholars and practitioners in their respective disciplines.

SIA students also learn from faculty from throughout Penn State, including the Smeal College of Business, College of Engineering, College of Earth and Mineral Sciences, College of Agricultural Science, and the Eberly College of Science. The combination of these schools allows SIA to offer programs  in interdisciplinary range and flexibility.

The school is a full member of the Association of Professional Schools of International Affairs (APSIA), a group of schools of public policy, public administration, and international studies.

References

Penn State School of International
Schools of international relations in the United States
Universities and colleges in Centre County, Pennsylvania
Educational institutions established in 2007
2007 establishments in Pennsylvania